Kulsky Stanok (Khülei Ürtöö) is a rural locality (a selo) in Khorinsky District, Republic of Buryatia, Russia. The population was 571 as of 2010. There are 12 streets.

Geography 
Kulsky Stanok is located 14 km west of Khorinsk (the district's administrative centre) by road. Kulsk is the nearest rural locality.

References 

Rural localities in Khorinsky District